Established in 1934, the American Board of Radiology (ABR) is an independent, not-for-profit professional association with headquarters in Tucson, Arizona. It oversees the certification and ongoing professional development of physician specialists in diagnostic radiology, interventional radiology, and radiation oncology, as well as medical physicists in diagnostic, nuclear, and therapy medical physics.

The ABR certifies its diplomates through a comprehensive process involving educational requirements, professional peer evaluation, and examination.

See also
American Osteopathic Board of Radiology
American Board of Medical Specialties
American Board of Science in Nuclear Medicine

References

External links
 

Radiology organizations
Medical associations based in the United States
Organizations established in 1934
Medical and health organizations based in Arizona